Shaposhnikov is a rural locality (a khutor) in Alexeyevsky District, Belgorod Oblast, Russia. The population was 14 in 2010. There is one street.

Geography 
Shaposhnikov is located 15 km southeast of Alexeyevka (the district's administrative centre) by road. Menyaylovo is the nearest rural locality.

References 

Rural localities in Alexeyevsky District, Belgorod Oblast
Biryuchensky Uyezd